Lydia Dotto (1949–2022) was a Canadian science journalist and author, a wildlife photographer, and an educator on science communication.

Career 
Dotto was a journalist with the Edmonton Journal in 1969 and with the Toronto Star between 1970 and 1971. She graduated with an Honours degree from Carleton University School of Journalism in 1971. Her articles were published in The Globe and Mail, Canadian Business and en Route among others.

Dotto was staff science writer for The Globe and Mail from 1972-1978. Her writing on nuclear terrorism, high-energy physics, global warming and other topics earned awards from the Canadian Science Writers' Association. She completed two dives under the Arctic ice for an article on cold-water diving. She covered space missions including Skylab, Apollo, the Space Shuttle and the International Space Station. She was the first female member of the press corps permitted aboard the  aircraft carrier to cover the splashdown of Skylab 4 astronauts.  

Dotto's association with NASA and the Canadian Space Agency continued even after leaving The Globe and Mail, in part through her rapport with astronauts Chris Hadfield and Marc Garneau. She held interviews with Canadian astronauts and participated in a zero-gravity training flight at the Johnson Space Centre. Through her skills and sources, Dotto published books and articles on space and the environment to become a leading freelance science writer and environmental journalist (see Bibliography).

Dotto was President of the Canadian Science Writers' Association from 1979-1980 and executive editor of Canadian Science News Service from 1982-1992. For her accomplishments, she was awarded the Sandford Fleming Medal for science communication by the Royal Canadian Institute in 1983. She was chosen to give a talk on "Planet Earth as a Life Support System" for the 1990 Royal Astronomical Society of Canada General Assembly.

The year she turned 65, Dotto shifted her focus to wildlife photography. Wildlife magazines published her pictures from Canada, Costa Rica, Tanzania and elsewhere. Starting in 2005, Dotto taught environmental communication at Trent University close to her home in Peterborough, Ontario and led science writing and communication workshops.

Personal life 
Lydia Dotto was born to August and Assunta Dotto in Cadomin, Alberta, moving to Edmonton when she was a few years old. She has a younger sister, Terry.

Dotto attended the first Beatles concert in Canada at Empire Stadium in Vancouver and was a lifelong Beatles fan.

Lydia graduated from Austin O'Brien Catholic High School in 1968.

In her online art store, Dotto stated "I enjoy merging diverse artistic paths, never knowing where they will take me but always enjoying the journey".

Lydia Dotto died in 2022 in Peterborough with her family by her side.

Bibliography 

 
   
 
 Conference Report: 
 
 
 
 
 
 French Translation: Le ciel nous tombe sur la tête: sommes-nous entrain de risquer le climat de notre planète? (2001)
 Encyclopedia Article: Canadian Space Agency

References 

Canadian journalists
Women science writers
Science writers
Canadian science writers
Science journalists
1949 births
2022 deaths